RIIA may mean:

Chatham House, also known as the Royal Institute of International Affairs;
Resource initialization is acquisition, concept from computer science
rIIA the A cistron of the T4 rII system a gene in the T4 virus.

See also 
RIA (disambiguation)
RIAA